Cleremont Farm is a historic home and farm located near Upperville, Loudoun County, Virginia.  The original section of the house was built in two stages between about 1820 and 1835, and added onto subsequently in the 1870s. 1940s. and 1980s.  It consists of a stone portion, a log portion, and a stone kitchen wing.  It has a five bay, two-story, gable-roofed center section in the Federal style.  A one-bay, one-story Colonial Revival-style pedimented entrance portico was built in the early 1940s. Also on the property are the contributing original -story, stuccoed stone dwelling (1761); a stone kitchen from the late 19th or early 20th century; a stuccoed frame tenant house built about 1940; a stone carriage mount; and a series of five stone walls.

It was listed on the National Register of Historic Places in 1997.

References

Houses on the National Register of Historic Places in Virginia
Farms on the National Register of Historic Places in Virginia
Federal architecture in Virginia
Colonial Revival architecture in Virginia
Houses completed in 1820
Houses in Loudoun County, Virginia
National Register of Historic Places in Loudoun County, Virginia